Mario Ančić and Andy Ram were the defending champions, but Ančić did not participate this year.  Ram partnered Jonathan Erlich, losing in the quarterfinals.

Jordan Kerr and Jim Thomas won the title, defeating Wayne Black and Kevin Ullyett 6–7(7–9), 7–6(7–3), 6–3 in the final.

Seeds

Draw

Draw

References
Draw
 

Doubles
2004 ATP Tour